Manjula Gururaj is an Indian female playback singer and a voice-over artist who has primarily worked in Kannada cinema and also runs a music school. She has sung over 500 songs in Kannada language. The following is a list of her songs:

1980s

1990s

2000-present

Tamil songs

Telugu songs

References

Gururaj, Manjula
Discographies of Indian artists